Håkon Martin Henriksen Five (27 September 1880 – 15 January 1944) was a Norwegian politician for the Liberal Party. He was Minister of Agriculture 1919–1920, 1921–1923, 1924–1926 and 1933–1935, and Minister of Provisioning 1919–1920.

Five was Member of Parliament for Nord-Trøndelag county 1922-1930 and 1934–1936. He also served as County Governor of Nord-Trøndelag from 1927 until his death in 1944.

References 

Politicians from Nord-Trøndelag
Ministers of Agriculture and Food of Norway
Members of the Storting
1880 births
1944 deaths